Chirostyloidea is an anomuran superfamily with squat lobster-like representatives. It comprises the three families Chirostylidae, Eumunididae and Kiwaidae. Although representatives of Chirostyloidea are superficially similar to galatheoid squat lobsters, they are more closely related to Lomisoidea and Aegloidea together forming the clade Australopoda. No fossils can be confidently assigned to the Chirostyloidea, although Pristinaspina may belong either in the family Kiwaidae or Chirostylidae.

Genera
Chirostylidae Ortmann, 1892
Chirostylus Ortmann, 1892
Gastroptychus Caullery, 1896
Hapaloptyx Stebbing, 1920
Uroptychodes Baba, 2004
Uroptychus Henderson, 1888

Eumunididae A. Milne-Edwards & Bouvier, 1900
Eumunida Smith, 1883
Pseudomunida Haig, 1979

Kiwaidae Macpherson, Jones & Segonzac, 2005
Kiwa Macpherson, Jones & Segonzac, 2005

References

Squat lobsters
Arthropod superfamilies